The Takli Formation is a Maastrichtian geologic formation in India. Dinosaur remains diagnostic to the genus level are among the fossils that have been recovered from the formation.

See also 
 List of dinosaur-bearing rock formations
 List of stratigraphic units with few dinosaur genera

References

Bibliography 
  

Geologic formations of India
Cretaceous Asia
Maastrichtian Stage
Shale formations
Siltstone formations
Marl formations
Fluvial deposits
Lacustrine deposits
Paleontology in India